The 1915 VFL Grand Final was an Australian rules football game contested between the Collingwood Football Club and Carlton Football Club, held at the Melbourne Cricket Ground in Melbourne on 18 September 1915. It was the 18th annual Grand Final of the Victorian Football League, staged to determine the premiers for the 1915 VFL season. The match, attended by 39,343 spectators, was won by Carlton by a margin of 33 points, marking that club's fifth premiership victory and second in succession.

Teams

 Umpire - Norden

Statistics

Goalkickers

References
AFL Tables: 1915 Grand Final

See also
 1915 VFL season

VFL/AFL Grand Finals
Grand
Carlton Football Club
Collingwood Football Club
September 1915 sports events